Farnley Hall may refer to the following stately places in England:
 Farnley Hall, North Yorkshire
 Farnley Hall, West Yorkshire
 Farnley Hall Park, a park in Farnley, Leeds

See also
 Farley Hall (disambiguation)
 Farnley (disambiguation)

Architectural disambiguation pages